Curtis Reid (born 11 December 1994) is a New Zealand rugby union player. He currently plays for Manawatu in the Mitre 10 Cup.

Originally from Auckland, Reid attended Westlake Boys High School.

In 2015 Reid was part of the  set-up, however he only played matches for North Harbour B as others were preferred over him.

In early 2016 Reid moved down to Palmerston North to complete a business degree. He joined the College Old Boys club and based on a strong first club season he was selected for two Manawatu pre-season games.

He was then offered a full contract and he made his debut on 26 August against Southland.

References 

1994 births
People educated at Westlake Boys High School
Living people
Manawatu rugby union players